Ralph Kennedy may refer to:
Ralph Shealy Kennedy Jr. (born 1958), member of the South Carolina House of Representatives
Ralph Kennedy series, by Mark Clifton
Ralph Kennedy, character in 555